The 9th arrondissement of Lyon is one of the nine arrondissements of the City of Lyon. It covers the northwestern quarters Vaise, Gorge de Loup, Saint-Rambert-l'Île-Barbe, La Duchère and part of Champvert.

This zone is served by the metro line .

References

External links 

 Official website